Richard, Count of Évreux (c.1015–1067) was a powerful Norman nobleman during the reign of William Duke of Normandy.

Life
Richard was the eldest son of Robert II Archbishop of Rouen and Count of Évreux and Herleva. Richard donated a mill at Evreux to the abbey of Jumièges by charter dated [26 Mar 1038/14 Apr 1039]. In a charter of King William I, Richard is confirmed as having been a benefactor to that abbey. Richard and his wife, Godechildis, founded Saint-Sauveur d´Evreux. As Count of Evreux, he donated the church of Gravigny to Sainte-Trinité de Rouen, dated [1052/66]. Richard donated the tithe of a town to the abbey of Saint-Taurin.

Some report him as taking part in the battle of Hastings on 14 Oct 1066, but it is unlikely due to his advanced age and death the next year.  His son, William, was one of the few known companions of William the Conqueror at the Battle of Hastings in 1066. William contributed 80 ships to the invasion of England in 1066, appearing as Count of Évreux. Richard died in 1067.

Family
Richard married, after 1040, Godehildis (or Adelaide) Ramon, the widow of Roger I of Tosny.

Richard and Godehildis had the following issue:
William d'Evreux († 1118), succeeded his father as Count of Évreux.
Godehildis d'Evreux, nun at St. Sauveur, Évreux.
Agnes d'Evreux, married Simon I de Montfort.

Notes

References

Sources

1067 deaths
Counts of Évreux
Year of birth unknown
House of Normandy